

Statistics 2012-13

Squad information

  

  

Total squad cost: €5,775,000

From the youth system

Disciplinary record
Includes all competitive matches. The list is sorted by position, and then shirt number.

Transfers

In 

Total expenditure:

Out 

Total income:  €50,000

Competitions

Pre-season

Mid-season

Overall

League table

Results summary

Results by round

Matches

Kup Bosne i Hercegovine

Round of 32

Round of 16

Quarter-finals

Semi-finals

Final

UEFA Champions League

Second qualifying round

References

FK Željezničar Sarajevo seasons
Zeljeznicar